Dry Run is a  long 1st order tributary to Birds Branch in Patrick County, Virginia.

Course 
Dry Run rises about 2 miles southwest of Groundhog Mountain in Patrick County, Virginia and then flows south-southeast to join Birds Branch about 1 mile west-northwest Ararat.

Watershed 
Dry Run drains  of area, receives about 50.8 in/year of precipitation, has a wetness index of 378.73, and is about 45% forested.

See also 
 List of Virginia Rivers

References 

Rivers of Patrick County, Virginia
Rivers of Virginia